Beatriz Pomini Francisco (born ) is a Brazilian group rhythmic gymnast. She represents her nation at international competitions. She competed at world championships, including at the 2015 World Rhythmic Gymnastics Championships.

In 2013, Beatriz Francisco and the other members of the Brazilian group — Eliane Sampaio, Bianca Mendonça, Debora Falda, Francielly Pereira and Gabrielle Silva — earned the bronze medal on the 3 balls + 2 ribbons routine at the Minsk stage of the 2013 Rhythmic Gymnastics World Cup Series. This was not only Brazil's but also Latin America's first medal at the Rhythmic Gymnastics World Cup series, and only the second time a country from the Americas earned a medal at the World Cup, after Canada's Mary Fuzesi earned the bronze medal on ribbon at the 1990 FIG World Cup Final.

References

1996 births
Living people
Brazilian rhythmic gymnasts
Place of birth missing (living people)
Gymnasts at the 2015 Pan American Games
Pan American Games medalists in gymnastics
Pan American Games gold medalists for Brazil
Pan American Games silver medalists for Brazil
Medalists at the 2015 Pan American Games
Sportspeople from Paraná (state)